is a railway station on the Koumi Line in the village of Minamimaki in Nagano Prefecture, Japan, operated by the East Japan Railway Company (JR East). The station is the highest JR station in Japan.

Lines

Station layout
The station consists of one side platform and one island platform, serving three tracks, connected by a level crossing. The station has a Midori no Madoguchi staffed ticket office.

Platforms

History
Nobeyama Station opened on 29 November 1935. With the privatization of Japanese National Railways (JNR) on 1 April 1987, the station came under the control of JR East. The current station building was completed in March 1983.

Passenger statistics
In fiscal 2015, the station was used by an average of 165 passengers daily (boarding passengers only).

Surrounding area
Nobeyama radio observatory

Nobeyama SL Land

See also
 List of railway stations in Japan
 Murodō Station (the highest altitude station in Japan)
 Yoshioka-Kaitei Station (deepest underground station in Japan)
 Yatomi Station (overground station with the lowest altitude in Japan)

References

External links

  

Railway stations in Nagano Prefecture
Stations of East Japan Railway Company
Railway stations in Japan opened in 1935
Koumi Line
Minamimaki, Nagano